In statistics, the medcouple is a robust statistic that measures the skewness of a univariate distribution.  It is defined as a scaled median difference of the left and right half of a distribution. Its robustness makes it suitable for identifying outliers in adjusted boxplots. Ordinary box plots do not fare well with skew distributions, since they label the longer unsymmetrical tails as outliers. Using the medcouple, the whiskers of a boxplot can be adjusted for skew distributions and thus have a more accurate identification of outliers for non-symmetrical distributions.

As a kind of order statistic, the medcouple belongs to the class of incomplete generalised L-statistics. Like the ordinary median or mean, the medcouple is a nonparametric statistic, thus it can be computed for any distribution.

Definition 
The following description uses zero-based indexing in order to harmonise with the indexing in many programming languages. 

Define the sets
,
,
of sizes  and  respectively.

where  is the sign function.

The medcouple is then the median of the set
.

In other words, we split the distribution into all values greater or equal to the median and all values less than or equal to the median. We define a kernel function whose first variable is over the  greater values and whose second variable is over the  lesser values. For the special case of values tied to the median, we define the kernel by the signum function.

Properties of the medcouple 

The medcouple has a number of desirable properties. A few of them are directly inherited from the kernel function.

The medcouple kernel 

We make the following observations about the kernel function :

 The kernel function is location-invariant. If we add or subtract any value to each element of the sample , the corresponding values of the kernel function do not change.
 The kernel function is scale-invariant. Equally scaling all elements of the sample  does not alter the values of the kernel function.

These properties are in turn inherited by the medcouple. Thus, the medcouple is independent of the mean and standard deviation of a distribution, a desirable property for measuring skewness.
For ease of computation, these properties enable us to define the two sets

where .

For , the medcouple kernel reduces to

Using the recentred and rescaled set  we can observe the following.

The kernel function is between -1 and 1, that is, .
The medcouple kernel  is non-decreasing in each variable.

With properties 1, 2, and 4, we can thus define the following matrix,

The medcouple is then the median of this matrix with sorted rows and sorted columns. The fact that the rows and columns are sorted allows the implementation of a fast algorithm for computing the medcouple.

Robustness 

The breakdown point is the number of values that a statistic can resist before it becomes meaningless, i.e. the number of arbitrarily large outliers that the data set  may have before the value of the statistic is affected. For the medcouple, the breakdown point is 25%, since it is a median taken over the couples  such that .

Values 

Like all measures of skewness, the medcouple is positive for distributions that are skewed to the right, negative for distributions skewed to the left, and zero for symmetrical distributions. In addition, the values of the medcouple are bounded by 1 in absolute value.

Algorithms for computing the medcouple 

Before presenting medcouple algorithms, we recall that there exist  algorithms for the finding the median. Since the medcouple is a median, ordinary algorithms for median-finding are important.

Naïve algorithm 

The naïve algorithm for computing the medcouple is slow. It proceeds in two steps. First, it constructs the medcouple matrix  which contains all of the possible values of the medcouple kernel. In the second step, it finds the median of this matrix.

More concretely, the naïve algorithm proceeds as follows. Recall that we are using zero-based indexing.

 function naïve_medcouple(vector X):
     // X is a vector of size n.
     
     // Sorting in decreasing order can be done in-place in O(n log n) time
     sort_decreasing(X)
     
     xm := median(X)
     xscale := 2 * max(abs(X))
     
     // Define the upper and lower centred and rescaled vectors
     // they inherit X's own decreasing sorting
     Zplus  := [(x - xm)/xscale | x in X such that x >= xm]
     Zminus := [(x - xm)/xscale | x in X such that x <= xm]
     
     p := size(Zplus)
     q := size(Zminus)
     
     // Define the kernel function closing over Zplus and Zminus
     function h(i, j):
         a := Zplus[i]
         b := Zminus[j]
         
         if a == b:
             return signum(p - 1 - i - j)
         else:
             return (a + b) / (a - b)
         endif
     endfunction
     
     // O(n^2) operations necessary to form this vector
     H := [h(i, j) | i in [0, 1, ..., p - 1] and j in [0, 1, ..., q - 1]]
     
     return median(H)
 endfunction

The final call to median on a vector of size  can be done itself in  operations, hence the entire naïve medcouple algorithm is of the same complexity.

Fast algorithm 

The fast algorithm outperforms the naïve algorithm by exploiting the sorted nature of the medcouple matrix . Instead of computing all entries of the matrix, the fast algorithm uses the Kth pair algorithm of Johnson & Mizoguchi.

The first stage of the fast algorithm proceeds as the naïve algorithm. We first compute the necessary ingredients for the kernel matrix, with sorted rows and sorted columns in decreasing order.

Comparing a value against the kernel matrix 

For example, for determining all  and  such that , we have the following function:
     function greater_h(kernel h, int p, int q, real u):
         // h is the kernel function, h(i,j) gives the ith, jth entry of H
         // p and q are the number of rows and columns of the kernel matrix H
         
         // vector of size p
         P := vector(p)
         
         // indexing from zero
         j := 0
         
         // starting from the bottom, compute the [[supremum|least upper bound]] for each row
         for i := p - 1, p - 2, ..., 1, 0:
                  
             // search this row until we find a value less than u
             while j < q and h(i, j) > u:
                 j := j + 1
             endwhile
             
             // the entry preceding the one we just found is greater than u
             P[i] := j - 1
         endfor
         
         return P
     endfunction

Conceptually, the resulting  vector can be visualised as establishing a boundary on the matrix as suggested by the following diagram, where the red entries are all larger than :

It instead proceeds along  in the opposite direction, from the top right to the bottom left:

     function less_h(kernel h, int p, int q, real u):
     
         // vector of size p
         Q := vector(p)
         
         // last possible row index
         j := q - 1
         
         // starting from the top, compute the [[infimum|greatest lower bound]] for each row
         for i := 0, 1, ..., p - 2, p - 1:
         
             // search this row until we find a value greater than u
             while j >= 0 and h(i, j) < u:
                 j := j - 1
             endwhile
             
             // the entry following the one we just found is less than u
             Q[i] := j + 1
         endfor
         
         return Q
     endfunction

This lower boundary can be visualised like so, where the blue entries are smaller than :

We also have that the sums

Weighted median of row medians 

The second observation is that we can use the sorted matrix structure to instantly compare any element to at least half of the entries in the matrix. For example, the median of the row medians across the entire matrix is less than the upper left quadrant in red, but greater than the lower right quadrant in blue:

The yellow entries indicate the median of each row. If we mentally re-arrange the rows so that the medians align and ignore the discarded entries outside the boundaries,

we can select a weighted median of these medians, each entry weighted by the number of remaining entries on this row. This ensures that we can discard at least 1/4 of all remaining values no matter if we have to discard the larger values in red or the smaller values in blue:

Each row median can be computed in  time, since the rows are sorted, and the weighted median can be computed in  time, using a binary search.

Kth pair algorithm 

Putting together these two observations, the fast medcouple algorithm proceeds broadly as follows.

 Compute the necessary ingredients for the medcouple kernel function  with  sorted rows and  sorted columns.
 At each iteration, approximate the medcouple with the weighted median of the row medians.
 Compare this tentative guess to the entire matrix obtaining right and left boundary vectors  and  respectively. The sum of these vectors also gives us the rank of this tentative medcouple.
 If the rank of the tentative medcouple is exactly , then stop. We have found the medcouple.
This step always discards at least 1/4 of all remaining entries.

The initial sorting in order to form the  function takes  time. At each iteration, the weighted median takes  time, as well as the computations of the new tentative  and  left and right boundaries. Since each iteration discards at least 1/4 of all remaining entries, there will be at most  iterations. Thus, the whole fast algorithm takes  time.

Let us restate the fast algorithm in more detail.

 function medcouple(vector X):
     // X is a vector of size n
     
     // Compute initial ingredients as for the naïve medcouple
     sort_decreasing(X)
     
     xm := median(X)
     xscale := 2 * max(abs(X))
     
     Zplus  := [(x - xm)/xscale | x in X such that x >= xm]
     Zminus := [(x - xm)/xscale | x in X such that x <= xm]
     
     p := size(Zplus)
     q := size(Zminus)
     
     function h(i, j):
         a := Zplus[i]
         b := Zminus[j]
         
         if a == b:
             return signum(p - 1 - i - j)
         else:
             return (a + b) / (a - b)
         endif
     endfunction
     
     // Begin Kth pair algorithm (Johnson & Mizoguchi)
     
     // The initial left and right boundaries, two vectors of size p
     L := [0, 0, ..., 0]
     R := [q - 1, q - 1, ..., q - 1]
     
     // number of entries to the left of the left boundary
     Ltotal := 0
     
     // number of entries to the left of the right boundary
     Rtotal := p*q
     
     // Since we are indexing from zero, the medcouple index is one
     // less than its rank.
     medcouple_index := floor(Rtotal / 2)
     
     // Iterate while the number of entries between the boundaries is
     // greater than the number of rows in the matrix.
     while Rtotal - Ltotal > p:
         
         // Compute row medians and their associated weights, but skip
         // any rows that are already empty.
         middle_idx  := [i | i in [0, 1, ..., p - 1] such that L[i] <= R[i]]
         row_medians := [h(i, floor((L[i] + R[i])/2) | i in middle_idx]
         weights := [R[i] - L[i] + 1 | i in middle_idx]
         
         WM := weighted median(row_medians, weights)
         
         // New tentative right and left boundaries
         P := greater_h(h, p, q, WM)
         Q := less_h(h, p, q, WM)
         
         Ptotal := sum(P) + size(P)
         Qtotal := sum(Q)
         
         // Determine which entries to discard, or if we've found the medcouple
         if medcouple_index <= Ptotal - 1:
             R := P
             Rtotal := Ptotal
         else:
             if medcouple_index > Qtotal - 1:
                 L := Q
                 Ltotal := Qtotal
             else:
                 // Found the medcouple, rank of the weighted median equals medcouple index
                 return WM
             endif
         endif
    
     endwhile
     
     // Did not find the medcouple, but there are very few tentative entries remaining
     remaining := [h(i, j) | i in [0, 1, ..., p - 1],
                             j in [L[i], L[i] + 1, ..., R[i]]
                             such that L[i] <= R[i] ]
     
     // Select the medcouple by rank amongst the remaining entries
     medcouple := select_nth(remaining, medcouple_index - Ltotal)
    
     return medcouple
 endfunction

In real-world use, the algorithm also needs to account for errors arising from finite-precision floating point arithmetic. For example, the comparisons for the medcouple kernel function should be done within machine epsilon, as well as the order comparisons in the greater_h and less_h functions.

Software/source code 

 The fast medcouple algorithm is implemented in R's robustbase package.
 The fast medcouple algorithm is implemented in a C extension for Python in the Robustats Python package.
 A GPL'ed C++ implementation of the fast algorithm, derived from the R implementation.
 A Stata implementation of the fast algorithm.
 An implementation of the naïve algorithm in Matlab (and hence GNU Octave).
 The naïve algorithm is also implemented for the Python package statsmodels.

See also

 Robust statistic
 Skewness
 Adjusted boxplots

References

Robust statistics
Nonparametric statistics
Statistical deviation and dispersion
Statistical outliers